Donald Johnstone may refer to:
 Donald Johnstone (canoeist) (born 1963), New Zealand slalom canoer
 Donald Campbell Johnstone (1857-1920), British judge in India
 D. Bruce Johnstone (born 1941), American educator

See also
 Donald Johnston (disambiguation)